Franklin David Israel (born December 2, 1945, in Brooklyn, New York — d. June 10, 1996, in Los Angeles, California) was an American architect best known for his designs for private residences and offices for film production companies in Los Angeles.  He was a member of the L.A. Ten, "a loosely affiliated cadre of architects" working in Los Angeles during the 1980s and 1990s.

Education
Israel began studying philosophy at the University of Pennsylvania, but was drawn to architecture and switched to studying with renowned architect Louis Kahn.  He did postgraduate work at Yale University and then received his master of architecture from Columbia University.

Awards & honors 
 1975 Rome Prize for architecture

Selected works

Archives
The Getty Research Institute houses the Franklin D. Israel papers, 1967-1996. An archival collection consisting of project drawings and records, with the bulk of the material being architectural projects from the late-1980s to the mid-1990s; documents from his professional career; and a small series of personal papers.

References

Architects from California
People from Brooklyn
University of Pennsylvania alumni
Yale University alumni
Columbia Graduate School of Architecture, Planning and Preservation alumni
1945 births
1996 deaths
LGBT architects